Bulbophyllum moniliforme is a species of orchid in the genus Bulbophyllum. It is indigenous to the Assam region in eastern India.

References

The Bulbophyllum-Checklist
The Internet Orchid Species Photo Encyclopedia

moniliforme